Penicillium griseolum is an anamorph species of the genus of Penicillium.

References

griseolum
Fungi described in 1957